Asanka Samithajeewa Navarathne (born 9 January 1981) is a Sri Lankan politician, former provincial councillor and Member of Parliament.

Nawaratne was born on 9 January 1981. He is leader of the Sri Lanka People's Party. He was a member of Kurunegala Divisional Council and the North Western Provincial Council. He contested the 2015 parliamentary election as one of the United People's Freedom Alliance (UPFA) electoral alliance's candidates in Kurunegala District but failed to get elected after coming 17th amongst the UPFA candidates. He contested the 2020 parliamentary election as a Sri Lanka People's Freedom Alliance electoral alliance candidate in Kurunegala District and was elected to the Parliament of Sri Lanka.

References

1981 births
Local authority councillors of Sri Lanka
Living people
Members of the 16th Parliament of Sri Lanka
Members of the North Western Provincial Council
Sinhalese politicians
Sri Lankan Buddhists
Sri Lanka Mahajana Pakshaya politicians
Sri Lanka People's Freedom Alliance politicians
United People's Freedom Alliance politicians